Words and Music is a promotional album by the American Music Club singer/songwriter Mark Eitzel, released in 1997. It contains conversations and music with Peter Buck of R.E.M., and was released before Eitzel's album West.

Track listing
All songs written by Buck and Eitzel, except where noted:
"Free of Harm"
"In Your Life"
"Move Myself Ahead"
"Old Photographs"
"Three Inches of Wall"
"Then It Really Happens"
"Lower Eastside Tourist"
"Live Or Die"
"Fresh Screwdriver" (Live Acoustic Version)
"Helium" (Live Acoustic Version)

1997 albums
Mark Eitzel albums
Warner Records albums
Interview albums
Promotional albums